This is a list of flags that have been used in the Commonwealth of The Bahamas.

National flag

Royal and Viceregal flags

Government flags

Other flags

Political flags

Historical flags

Proposed flags

Yacht clubs of Bahamas
 	

Bahamian
Flags